Marco Ballarini (born 28 March 2001) is an Italian footballer who plays as a midfielder for  club Trento on loan from Udinese.

Career 
He made his Serie A debut for Udinese on 9 July 2020 in an away victory against SPAL.

On 5 October 2020, he went to Serie C side Piacenza on loan.

On 11 August 2021, he was loaned to Foggia in Serie C. On 31 January 2022, the loan was terminated early and he returned to Udinese. He remained on the bench for Udinese for the remainder of the 2021–22 season.

On 16 July 2022, Ballarini joined Trento on loan for a season.

Club statistics

Club

Notes

References

2001 births
Living people
Italian footballers
Association football midfielders
Udinese Calcio players
Piacenza Calcio 1919 players
Calcio Foggia 1920 players
A.C. Trento 1921 players
Serie A players
Serie C players